William Poyntz may refer to:

William Stephen Poyntz, 19th-century English politician
William Poyntz (high sheriff), 18th-century English High Sheriff of Berkshire